Sun Song may refer to:

 Song Sun, Chinese mathematician
 Jazz by Sun Ra, a Sun Ra album reissued as Sun Song